Papyrus Oxyrhynchus 226 (P. Oxy. 226 or P. Oxy. II 226) is a fragment of the Hellenica (VI,5) of Xenophon, written in Greek. It was discovered in Oxyrhynchus. The manuscript was written on papyrus in the form of a roll. It is dated to the first or second century. Currently it is housed at Columbia University  in New York City.

Description 
The document was written by an unknown copyist. The measurements of the fragment are 140 by 120 mm. The text is written in a medium-sized neat uncial hand. It has only a few, unimportant textual variants.

It was discovered by Grenfell and Hunt in 1897 in Oxyrhynchus. The text was published by Grenfell and Hunt in 1899.

See also 
 Oxyrhynchus Papyri
 Papyrus Oxyrhynchus 225
 Papyrus Oxyrhynchus 227

References 

226
1st-century manuscripts
2nd-century manuscripts